Karma Lhamo (born 6 May 1978) is a Bhutanese educator and politician. She was elected to the National Assembly in 2008, becoming one of its first female members elected under universal suffrage.

Biography
Lhamo was born in Tshakaling in May 1978, the  daughter of a Lam Neten. She was educated at Monggar School, and earned a BA in psychology at Mount Carmel College in Bangalore and a post-graduate certificate in education from the National Institute of Education. In 2006 she began work as a teacher at Chukha Higher Secondary School. She married and had two children.

In 2008 she resigned from her teaching job after being nominated as a Druk Phuensum Tshogpa candidate for the Monggar constituency in the National Assembly elections. She was elected to the National Assembly with 76% of the vote, defeating former Minister of Health Jigmi Singay.

She ran for re-election in 2013, but was defeated by Jigme Zangpo, losing by 272 votes. She ran again in 2018 but lost to Sherab Gyeltshen. However, following the resignation of Gyeltshen, Lhamo contested the by-election on 29 June 2021 as a candidate for the Druk Nyamrup Tshogpa and was elected.

References

1978 births
Living people
Mount Carmel College, Bangalore alumni
Bhutanese educators
Members of the National Assembly (Bhutan)
Bhutanese women in politics
Druk Phuensum Tshogpa MNAs